Shannon Harper was a popular United States co-writer of romantic novels. During years she collaborated with Madeline Porter by mail, fax machines and their computers, using pen names Elizabeth Habersham, Anna James and Madeline Harper. She also co-wrote books with Donna Ball as Leigh Bristol and Taylor Brady. She lives in Winter Haven, Florida, US.

References
Anne James's Webpage, Madeline Harper's Webpage, Leigh Bristol's Webpage and Taylor Brady's Wepage in Fantastic Fiction's Website

20th-century American novelists
American romantic fiction writers
American women novelists
20th-century American women writers